Rybka Lututowska  is a village in the administrative district of Gmina Galewice, within Wieruszów County, Łódź Voivodeship, in central Poland.

The village has a population of 240.

References

Rybka Lututowska